Vicente Valdero Cerdán (born 10 September 1905, date of death unknown) was a Spanish boxer who competed in the 1924 Summer Olympics. In 1924 he was eliminated in the second round of the lightweight class after losing his fight to Dick Beland of South Africa.

References

External links
 

1905 births
Year of death missing
Lightweight boxers
Olympic boxers of Spain
Boxers at the 1924 Summer Olympics
Spanish male boxers